The 2008 New Mexico Bowl was a post-season American college football bowl game held on December 20, 2008 at  University Stadium on the campus of the University of New Mexico in Albuquerque as part of the 2008-09 NCAA Bowl season. The game, telecast on ESPN, featured the Colorado State Rams from the Mountain West Conference and the Fresno State Bulldogs from the WAC. The two teams were rivals when Colorado State was in the WAC from 1968-98.

Colorado State scored 20 points in the fourth quarter to defeat Fresno State, 40-35 behind running back Gartrell Johnson's 375 rushing and receiving yards, an NCAA bowl record.

Game summary

Scoring summary

1st Quarter
FRES – Lonyae Miller 1-yard run (Kevin Goessling kick), 11:46. Fresno State 7-0. Drive: 7 plays, 72 yards, 3:14.
CSU – Grant Stucker 18-yard run (Jason Smith kick), 09:37. Colorado State 7-7. Drive: 4 plays, 84 yards, 2:09.
FRES – Anthony Harding 2-yard run (Kevin Goessling kick), 06:35. Fresno State 14-7. Drive: 7 plays, 73 yards, 3:02.
CSU – Jason Smith 29-yard field goal, 02:57. Fresno State 14-10. Drive: 9 plays, 66 yards, 3:38.
2nd Quarter
CSU – Jason Smith 22-yard field goal, 05:50. Fresno State 14-13. Drive: 10 plays, 75 yards, 5:35.
FRES – Lonyae Miller 69-yard run (Kevin Goessling kick), 04:26. Fresno State 21-13. Drive: 4 plays, 80 yards, 1:24.
CSU – Kory Sperry 22-yard pass from Billy Ferris (Jason Smith kick), 00:02. Fresno State 21-20. Drive: 12 plays, 87 yards, 4:24.
3rd Quarter
FRES – Anthony Harding 2-yard run (Kevin Goessling kick), 08:31. Fresno State 28-20. Drive: 7 plays, 59 yards, 3:51.
4th Quarter
CSU – Gartrell Johnson 1-yard run (Johnson run failed), 09:45. Fresno State 28-26. Drive: 7 plays, 32 yards, 3:41.
CSU – Rashaun Greer 69-yard pass from Billy Ferris (Jason Smith kick), 07:00. Colorado State 33-28. Drive: 3 plays, 73 yards, 1:07.
CSU – Gartrell Johnson 77-yard run (Johnson run failed), 01:46. Colorado State 40-28. Drive: 2 plays, 85 yards, 0:57.
FRES – Ryan Skidmore 7-yard pass from Tom Brandstater (Kevin Goessling kick), 00:55. Colorado State 40-35. Drive: 5 plays, 59 yards, 0:51.

Game Notes

Gartrell Johnson set an FBS bowl game record for yards from scrimmage with 375
Johnson's 285 rushing yards were second most in FBS bowl history (P.J. Daniels, 307 in 2003)
Johnson's rushing performance ranked second in Colorado State history
Colorado State won their first bowl game since 2001

References

External links
 Box Score - ESPN

New Mexico Bowl
New Mexico Bowl
Colorado State Rams football bowl games
Fresno State Bulldogs football bowl games
2008 in sports in New Mexico